The Party of Peaceful Renovation was a liberal political organisation in the Russian Empire, based amongst landlords and the bourgeoisie.

It was formed in 1906, uniting the Left Octobrists and Right Cadets. Party leaders were Pyotr Heiden, N. N. Lvov, P. P. Ryabushinsky, Mikhail Stakhovich, E. N. Trubetskoy, his brother Grigory Nikolaevich Trubetskoy, D.N. Shipov.

References

Political parties established in 1906
Political parties in the Russian Empire
1906 establishments in the Russian Empire
Liberal parties in Russia